Rio Vista station is a station on the San Diego Trolley's Green Line. The street-level station has side platforms. It is located near Qualcomm Way and the San Diego River. The station is a part of the Rio Vista development, which includes apartments and office parks in the Mission Valley East neighborhood.

Before July 2005, this station was served by the Blue Line until service between Old Town Transit Center and Mission San Diego was replaced by the Green Line upon its introduction in conjunction with the opening of the Mission Valley East extension.

Station layout
There are two tracks, each served by a side platform.

See also
 List of San Diego Trolley stations

References

Green Line (San Diego Trolley)
San Diego Trolley stations in San Diego
Railway stations in the United States opened in 1997
1997 establishments in California